{{Infobox newspaper
| name               = Morgunblaðið
| logo               = Morgunblaðið Logo.svg
| image              = 
| caption            = Morgunblaðiðs front page, 8 December 2005
| type               = Daily newspaper
| format             = 
| foundation         = 1913
| ceased publication = 
| political          = Centre-right
| price              = 
| owners             = Árvakur
| founders           = Vilhjálmur FinsenÓlafur Björnsson
| political position = 
| publisher          = 
| editor             = Davíð Oddsson and Haraldur Johannessen
| maneditor          = 
| newseditor         = 
| opeditor           = 
| sportseditor       = 
| photoeditor        = 
| staff              = 
| circulation        = 50,000
| headquarters       = Reykjavík, Iceland
| ISSN               = 1021-7266
| oclc               = 
| website            = 
}}Morgunblaðið''' (The Morning Paper) is an Icelandic newspaper. Morgunblaðiðs website, mbl.is, is the most popular website in Iceland.

HistoryMorgunblaðið was founded by Vilhjálmur Finsen and Ólafur Björnsson, brother of Iceland's first president. The first issue, only eight pages long, was published on 2 November 1913.

On 25 February 1964, the paper first printed a caricature by Sigmúnd Jóhannsson which featured the first landings on Surtsey. He became a permanent cartoonist for Morgunblaðið in 1975 and worked there until October 2008.

In a controversial decision, the owners of the paper decided in September 2009 to appoint Davíð Oddsson, a member of the Independence Party, Iceland's longest-serving Prime Minister and former Governor of the Central Bank, as one of the two editors of the paper.

In May 2010, Helgi Sigurðsson was hired as the papers cartoonist. He became known for controversial drawings on topics such as immigration, refugees and COVID-19. His last drawing was published on 14 December 2021. On 7 January 2022, it was reported that Helgi had resigned from Morgunblaðið'', following editorial requests that he would tone down his latest submissions.

See also 
 List of newspapers in Iceland
 List of non-English newspapers with English language subsections

References

External links 

 Morgunblaðið website
 Morgunblaðið in the VESTNORD project - Archive with all issues from 1913 to 2017

Newspapers established in 1913
Daily newspapers published in Iceland
1913 establishments in Iceland
Mass media in Reykjavík
Icelandic-language newspapers